Park ships were merchant steamships constructed for Canada’s Merchant Navy during the Second World War. Park ships and Fort ships (built in Canada for operation by the British) were the Canadian equivalent of the American Liberty ships. All three shared a similar design by J.L. Thompson and Sons of Sunderland, England. Fort ships had a triple expansion steam engine and a single screw propeller. Fort ships were ships transferred to the British government and the Park ships were those employed by the Canadian government, both had the similar design. Park ships were named after local and National Parks of Canada. A few Park ships were launched as "Camp ships", named after Canada military camps, but were quickly renamed after Parks.  was the first Park ship lost to enemy attack, in the Indian Ocean after a torpedo attack from U-177 in the Indian Ocean, South of Durban,  South Africa.

Park Steamship Company
The Allied merchant fleet suffered significant losses in the early years of the Battle of the Atlantic as a result of U-boat attacks. The Park Steamship Company was created by the Canadian government on April 8, 1942 to oversee construction of a merchant fleet to help replace the lost vessels and to administer the movement of materiel. This was part of a coordinated Allied effort that saw the construction of British, American and Canadian merchant ships using a common class of vessel known as the North Sands class (named after a beach near the J. L Thompson yard on the River Wear).

Vessels

Over the next three years, the company ordered approximately 160 bulk cargo ships and 20 tankers that would all fly the Canadian flag. Ships at 10,000 tons deadweight were known as Park class. 43 smaller vessels, at a nominal 4,700 tons, were at first designated Grey class but were later called Park ships as well and were commonly known as the 4700 tonner Park ships. All the Park ships were powered by coal driven steam engines. All but two vessels launched were named for federal, provincial or municipal parks in Canada. Some were armed with bow guns and anti-torpedo nets. Two of the Park ships were lost to natural hazards and four were lost due to enemy action. One, built at the Pictou Shipyard in Pictou, Nova Scotia was one of two Allied ships destroyed by enemy action in the North Sea in the last hour of the war in Europe on 7 May 1945.

At the same time, Canada produced 90 additional vessels for the American government which were turned over to the British Merchant Navy under a lend-lease agreement. Built to the same design but designed to burn oil instead of coal, these vessels were known as Fort ships, and they took their names from forts. Like many of the Fort ships, Fort Charlotte was launched as a Park. The hull of the Park ships were riveted, not welded.

After the war, by 1948, all the Fort ships had been sold to private companies all around the world. The new owners gave the ships new names.

Crew
Park ships were armed. There were merchant seamen gunners. Also many British and Canadian merchantmen naval gunners  as Defensively equipped merchant ship (DEMS) . The guns were operated  by Royal Navy or  Royal Artillery Maritime Regiment personnel with the civilian crews trained to aid in passing ammunition and loading. The American ships carried Naval Armed Guard gunners.  Merchant seamen crewed the merchant ships of the British Merchant Navy which kept the United Kingdom supplied with raw materials, arms, ammunition, fuel, food and all of the necessities of a nation at war throughout World War II literally enabling the country to defend itself.  In doing this they sustained a considerably greater casualty rate than almost every branch of the armed services and suffered great hardship. Seamen were aged from fourteen through to their late seventies.
The lost are remembered in The Royal Canadian Naval Ships Memorial Monument in Spencer Smith Park in Burlington, Ontario.

Shipyards
 The shipbuilding program was not easy to implement as Canada had only four operational shipyards with nine berths in 1940. By 1943, there were six additional shipyards and a total of 38 berths. These were all private shipyards located across Canada - on the East Coast at Pictou and Saint John, in Montreal, Sorel and Lauzon on the St. Lawrence River, at Collingwood on Georgian Bay, and Victoria, Vancouver and Prince Rupert on the Pacific Coast. Only the yards at Montreal, Saint John, Victoria and Collingwood had existed before the war. By 1945, there were 57,000 men and women employed in building or repairing merchant ships in Canada and several thousand more were employed building ships for the Royal Canadian Navy.

The table shows the name of the shipyard and city, and the number of vessels launched by each yard. Eventually thousands of Canadians and British would serve aboard these Canadian Merchant Navy ships.

Ships in class

Park-type cargo ships

Modified Scandinavian-class cargo

Park-type tankers

Park-type tankers, Great Lakes Trading
Tankers for World War II, converted to cargo after war:

Lost in action

 was the first Park ship lost to enemy action when torpedoed near Madagascar. Four of the crew were killed. HMAS Quiberon and HMAS Quickmatch rescued 45 crew and 6 DEMS gunners. 
SS Point Pleasant Park was torpedoed near Cape Town, South Africa on February 23, 1945 with nine crew lost. 
 sank in the North Sea on March 13, 1945 after German midget U-boat attack (the two-man Seehund type). Four gunners and 24 crew were killed out of the 32 persons on board, the crew was British. She was southeast of Great Yarmouth in England.
The SS Avondale Park sank by U-boat on May 7, 1945 while under charter to Ministry of War Transport. Two men were killed and there were 39 survivors. Avondale Park was the last Allied ship lost to German submarines during the war.

Notable incidents
Park Ships sank or damaged:

  had an explosion on March 6, 1945, two seamen lost their lives at Vancouver Harbor.
 Yoho Park (I)  sold and renamed Darfield in  1950, ran aground in fog near Los Angeles and scrapped in 1954.
  sold in 1952 renamed Theodora was wrecked in 1958 in the Gulf of Kutch on a reef.
  sold in 1964 renamed Mount Othrys and wrecked in 1968 near Port Okhra, India.
  sold in 1960 renamed Silver Valley and was wrecked in the River Douro bar, Oporto, Portugal in 1963.
  sold and renamed Caribbean Trader in 1958 and wrecked on Scorpion Reef, Mexico in 1963.
  sold in 1946 and renamed Dufferin Bell and was wrecked at the mouth of the Framboise River in Cape Breton Nova Scotia in 1951.
  sold in 1967 renamed Manos Lemos and was wrecked in Gulf of Kuşadası, Turkey in 1969.
  sold in 1948 renamed Docteur Angier and wrecked in 1949 of Yoron, Kagoshima.
  sold in 1948 renamed Docteur Yersin and was wrecked in 1953 on sandbank near Dong, South Korea
  sold in 1966 renamed Dong San and was wrecked in 1972 near Mukoh, Klaten Regency, Indonesia.
  sold in 1965 renamed Azar and was wrecked off West Punta Brava, Cuba in 1968.
  sold in 1975 renamed Merian and was wrecked off Othoni, Greece in 1977
  sold in 1951 renamed  Ilha Grande and was wrecked of Manoel Luiz Reef near Rio de Janeiro in 1962.
  sold 1953 renamed Halcyon  broke in two after collision with Japanese Gen-ei Maru in Kanmon Strait, then scrapped.
  sold in 1961 renamed Xenophon stranded near Brest, France on 26 Oct 1962 and later sank in March of 1963.
  sold in 1948 renamed Gerda Toft on 23 Dec. 1954 sank in heavy seas in 54.20N 02.32W off Isle of May in Scotland.
  sold in 1959 renamed Vinkon grounded on 1  Sep.1962 in typhoon at Hong Kong then scrapped at Hong Kong.
  sold in 1948 renamed Amaryllis on 7 Sep. 1965 sank on Riviera Beach, Florida in hurricane. 
  sold in 1954 renamed Noutsi, on 28 March 1965 ran aground in fog off Constantza, Romania and abandoned.
  sold in 1962 renamed Pella on 31 July 1964 was wrecked off Amrum Island of Germany.
  sold in 1971 renamed Lightening in 1976 damaged by mine at Chalna Port, later scrapped at Chittagong, Bangladesh.
  sold in 1954 renamed Polyxeni in 1965 ran aground off Vitoria, Brazil later scrapped at Valencia.
  sold in 1950 renamed Harry Lundeberg on 8 Feb. 1954 was wrecked off Cape San Lucas, Baja California
  on 19 Aug. 1946 was wrecked on Preparis Shoal in the Bay of Bengal on voyage from Calcutta to Vancouver.
  sold in 1952 renamed Irvinglake on Nov. of 1963 ran aground near Bathurst, New Brunswick
  sold in 1980 renamed Witsupply II on Sep. of 1989 ran aground off St. Maarten in the Caribbean, was refloated and scuttled.
  sold in 1951 renamed Champlain, on 26 June 1955 was wrecked in typhoon at Yulin, Hainan Island on voyage from Whampoa to Yulin.
  sold in 1960 renamed Shun Fung on 5 Sep. 1964 was wrecked in Hong Kong after breaking from moorings in typhoon.
  on 7 Oct. 1945 ran aground in Magdalena Bay, Baja California.
  sold in 1950 renamed Nordicstar on 27 Dec. 1956 reported in location as middle of the North Atlantic Ocean, then went missing. Was on voyage from Philadelphia to Le Havre with load of coal.
  sold in 1949 renamed Aghia Aanastasia on 22 June 1950 ran aground off Tobago on voyage from Baltimore to Rio de Janeiro. She was refloated but sank on 25th of June.

See also
 Allied technological cooperation during World War II
 Empire ships
 List of Liberty ships

Notes

References

Further reading
 Syd C. Heal, A Great Fleet of Ships: the Canadian forts & parks, Vanwell Publishing, 1999

External links
 Launch of the SS Victoria Park, Pictou, Nova Scotia (newsclipping)
 Launch of the SS Asby Park, Pictou, Nova Scotia (newsclipping)

Maritime history of Canada
 
Steamships of Canada
Canadian Merchant Navy
Naval history of Canada
Fleet of the Canadian Merchant Navy